Bobby Lugo is a former member of the Arizona House of Representatives. He served in the House from January 2001 through January 2003, serving district 8. After redistricting in 2002, he ran for re-election in District 25. Along with Manuel Alvarez he won the Democrat primary, but lost in the general election to Republican Jennifer J. Burns.

References

Hispanic and Latino American state legislators in Arizona
Democratic Party members of the Arizona House of Representatives